Wacław Aleksander Maciejowski (10 September 1792 – 10 February 1883) was a Polish historian.

Maciejowski was born in Cierlicko near Cieszyn. He studied in Warsaw, Berlin, and Göttingen, and became professor of law at the University of Warsaw in 1819.

He wrote three major works: a history of Slavic legislation (1832–38, 4 vols.; 2nd ed. 1856–65, 6 vols.), a history of Polish literature since the 16th century (1851–62, 3 vols.) and a history of the peasants of Poland (1874); the latter was the first monograph to be written on the Polish peasantry. He followed the historical Romanticism of Joachim Lelewel, and had a Pan-Slavic outlook.

References

External links
 
 

1792 births
1883 deaths
People from Karviná District
People from Austrian Silesia
People from Cieszyn Silesia
19th-century Polish historians
Polish male non-fiction writers
Academic staff of the University of Warsaw